Alwyn Wilhelm Cornelius Johannes Hollenbach (born 14 June 1985) is a former South African rugby union footballer that mostly played as a centre.

He retired from rugby during the 2015 season.

References

External links

Lions profile
itsrugby.co.uk profile

Living people
1985 births
South African rugby union players
Cheetahs (rugby union) players
Free State Cheetahs players
Golden Lions players
Griquas (rugby union) players
Lions (United Rugby Championship) players
Rugby union centres
Rugby union players from Johannesburg
University of the Free State alumni
Afrikaner people
Alumni of Grey College, Bloemfontein